Säffle Municipality (Säffle kommun) is a municipality in Värmland County in west central Sweden. Its seat is located in the city of Säffle.

Säffle was the last local government unit in Sweden to get the title of a city, in 1951. In 1952 the system with different types of municipalities was made obsolete, but it formally existed until 1971. The present municipality was created in that year, when the city was amalgamated with the surrounding rural municipalities.

The municipality covers a peninsula in Lake Vänern (Värmlandsnäs), and has a large fresh water archipelago.

Värmlandsnäs
Värmlandsnäs, also called Näset, is a big and important part of the municipality. The area which reaches out into the middle of Lake Vänern as a big peninsula is very significant to the economy by the produce of pork. The area supplies more than 200,000 people with pork.

Näset also has an archipelago on the east side. The boat people talk very well of Millesvik Archipelago (Millesviks skärgård), which also has a lot of old runestones and other ancient monuments.

From Ekenäs harbor you can take the tourist boat to Lurö, a small island in Lake Vänern. At Lurö you can dine and stay over night.

Many people who visit Värmlandsnäs in the summer wants to take a swim in Lake Vänern. The opportunities are plenty and good. At Ekenäs you will find a very nice bathing place. From this place you can almost walk all the way out to Lurö. Other popular bathing places are Ekôrn and the bathing place at Örud near Örö harbor (Örö hamn).

Localities
Säffle, pop. 9,500 (seat)
Värmlandsbro, 630
Svanskog, ca 600
Nysäter, ca 200
Hulta

Government and politics
The municipal commissioner of Säffle Municipality is Daniel Bäckström and he was elected in 2006. He represents the Centre Party.

Distribution of the 41 seats in the municipal council after the 2010 election:
Social Democratic Party   12
Centre Party   12
Moderate Party   6
Sjukvårdspartiet i Värmland   6
Sweden Democrats   2
Green Party   1
Liberal People's Party   1
Christian Democrats   1

Results of the 2010 Swedish general election in Säffle:
Social Democratic Party   33.6%
Moderate Party   27.4%
Centre Party   12.1%
Sweden Democrats   6.4%
Christian Democrats   5.9%
Liberal People's Party   5.6%
Green Party   4.4%
Left Party   3.9%

International relations

Twin towns — Sister cities
Säffle Municipality is twinned with:

References

External links

Säffle Municipality - Official site

Municipalities of Värmland County
iu:ᓴᕝᓕ